Heterobranchus isopterus is a species of airbreathing catfish found in West Africa.

References

Fish of Africa
Clariidae
Fish described in 1863
Taxa named by Pieter Bleeker